was a Japanese cyclist. He competed in four events at the 1952 Summer Olympics.

References

1935 births
2020 deaths
Japanese male cyclists
Olympic cyclists of Japan
Cyclists at the 1952 Summer Olympics